MasterChef Singapore is a Singaporean reality competitive cooking show based on the original British MasterChef. It is produced by Beach House Pictures and Motion Content Group and airs on Mediacorp Channel 5. Bjorn Shen (Chef/Owner of Artichoke), Damian D'Silva (Executive Chef of Restaurant Kin) and Audra Morrice (MasterChef Australia series 4 finalist and MasterChef Asia judge) serve as the show's main judges.

The first season premiered at 9:30 pm on 2 September 2018. A second series was announced in August 2020; it premiered on 21 February 2021. A third season of MasterChef Singapore was announced on 19 August 2021, it premiered on 1 May 2022.

Series overview

Seasons

Specials
A two-part special, in which four returning contestants from the first season mentored four new contestants from disadvantaged backgrounds for a chance to win an internship in the food industry, aired on November 2 and 9, 2019.

References

External links

Beach House Pictures — Official Production Website
Motion Content Group — Official Production Website

Singapore
2018 Singaporean television series debuts
2010s Singaporean television series
2021 Singaporean television series debuts
Non-British television series based on British television series
Channel 5 (Singapore) original programming
Television series by Blue Ant Studios